Serine/threonine-protein kinase Sgk2 is an enzyme that in humans is encoded by the SGK2 gene.

This gene encodes a serine/threonine protein kinase. Although this gene product is similar to serum- and glucocorticoid-induced protein kinase (SGK), this gene is not  induced by serum or glucocorticoids. This gene is induced in response to signals that activate phosphatidylinositol 3-kinase (PI3K), which is also true for SGK. Two alternate transcripts encoding two different isoforms have been described.

References

Further reading

External links
 
 

EC 2.7.11